Kentucky's 2nd congressional district is a congressional district in the U.S. state of Kentucky. Located in west central Kentucky, the district includes Bowling Green, Owensboro, Elizabethtown, and a portion of eastern Louisville. The district has not seen an incumbent defeated since 1884.

The district is currently represented by Republican Brett Guthrie.

Former Representative Democrat William Natcher is noted for holding the record for most consecutive roll call votes in the history of Congress - more than 18,000 votes.

Characteristics
The district is similar in character to the 1st district.  While Democrats still hold most local offices in the district, they tend to be very conservative on social issues, a trend that leads them to vote Republican in most national elections.

Until January 1, 2006, Kentucky did not track party affiliation for registered voters who were neither Democratic nor Republican. The Kentucky voter registration card does not explicitly list anything other than Democratic Party, Republican Party, or Other, with the "Other" option having a blank line and no instructions on how to register as something else.

Kentucky counties within the 2nd congressional district: Barren, Breckinridge, Bullitt, Butler, Daviess, Edmonson, Grayson, Green, Hancock, Hardin, Hart, Jefferson (partial), LaRue, Logan (partial), McLean, Meade, Muhlenberg, Nelson (partial), Ohio, Warren.

Recent presidential elections

List of members representing the district

Recent election results

2002

2004

2006

2008

2010

2012

2014

2016

2018

2020

2022

See also

Kentucky's congressional districts
List of United States congressional districts

References

 Congressional Biographical Directory of the United States 1774–present

02
Barren County, Kentucky
Boyle County, Kentucky
Breckinridge County, Kentucky
Bullitt County, Kentucky
Butler County, Kentucky
Daviess County, Kentucky
Edmonson County, Kentucky
Garrard County, Kentucky
Grayson County, Kentucky
Green County, Kentucky
Hancock County, Kentucky
Hardin County, Kentucky
Hart County, Kentucky
Jessamine County, Kentucky
LaRue County, Kentucky
Meade County, Kentucky
Mercer County, Kentucky
Nelson County, Kentucky
Spencer County, Kentucky
Warren County, Kentucky
Washington County, Kentucky
Constituencies established in 1792
1792 establishments in Kentucky
Constituencies disestablished in 1933
1933 disestablishments in Kentucky
Constituencies established in 1935
1935 establishments in Kentucky